Schiphol Busnet is the name used by Connexxion to operate the public transport by bus at Schiphol Airport and the town of Schiphol, and the surrounding towns of Aalsmeer, Amstelveen, Amsterdam and Badhoevedorp. Prior to December 2017, the network was operated using the brand name Schiphol Sternet.

General information
The Sternet, launched in 2000, was initially a joint-venture between Connexxion and GVB. As of 11 December 2011, the routes operated by GVB were handed over to Connexxion, who now operates all Sternet lines. It forms a merger of the private bus services for Schiphol employees and a few routes of the regional public transport from Schiphol to surrounding municipalities. For example, route 192 is the former route 68, route 195 is the former route 164 and route 199 is the former route 169. The buses run seven days a week until 01:00 at night, and start in the early morning. A few bus lines run throughout the night.

A short stretch through Schiphol-East is banned for people without a Schiphol Pass, as this is a so-called "secured zone". The rest is normal public transport. Fares can be paid with OV-Chipcard balance. Unlike in most buses in the Netherlands, where boarding at the driver's door is obligatory, entering the bus within Schiphol is allowed at every door of the bus and besides the OV-Chipcard, valid tickets within this area include the Schiphol Pass, KLM Pass and several other company related passes. This enables workers at Schiphol to park their cars at P30 (Schiphol-South) or P40 (Schiphol-North) at the edges of Schiphol, and continue by bus.

Schiphol has a well extended network of free bus lanes. Additionally, Schiphol Sternet buses are allowed to use shoulder lanes at motorways.

In December 2017, all buses were replaced by VDL Citea electric articulated buses. At the same time, the name "Schiphol Sternet" was replaced by "Schiphol Busnet".

Material
The Connexxion buses, and until 2011 also the GVB buses, are all painted in dark red, with a yellow Sternet logo. Connexxion uses Mercedes-Benz Citaro low floor buses with Euro 5 diesel engines. The buses are fully low-floor and have three wide doors. A special wheelchair entrance is at the middle door. Connexxion's own board computer Infoxx is installed in the bus, which automatically announces the next stop, shows traveling information on a screen, calculates the price for passengers paying using an OV-Chipcard and should enable the driver to see whether or not he is late or early.

A screen is installed at bus stops, showing the arrival of the next buses.

After December 2017, all buses have been replaced by white VDL Citea electric articulated buses. The name "Busnet" is not visible on the bus, only the Connexxion logo and "Schiphol" is visible.

Network

External links
 https://www.connexxion.nl/schiphol-busnet/1239 Schiphol Busnet website]
 Public transport route planner

Haarlemmermeer